George Reynolds House is a historic home located at Cape Vincent in Jefferson County, New York.  The limestone house is a -story, five-bay structure with a gable roof. Modifications undertaken in the 1920s introduced Colonial Revival details.  Also on the property is a three-bay frame carriage house.

It was listed on the National Register of Historic Places in 1985.

References

Houses on the National Register of Historic Places in New York (state)
Colonial Revival architecture in New York (state)
Houses in Jefferson County, New York
National Register of Historic Places in Jefferson County, New York